A Pearl in the Forest (Moilkhon, Buckthorn) is a 2008 Mongolian historical film.

This is a story about a young couple whose newly planned life was destroyed by the impact of the Great Purges of 1934–1938 in Mongolia.

The main goal of this movie was to provide a testimony for the many Buryats and Mongolians who were persecuted during the Great Purges initiated by Joseph Stalin. In 1937 and 1938, many people, and even entire families, were killed after being wrongfully accused of conspiracies.

The movie was shot on location near the Buryat village of Dadal in the Khentii province of Mongolia. The acting and other participation of many local villagers was a great addition to the authenticity of the film.

Synopsis

In the 1930s in Mongolia, a former villager returns as a government informer, and is determined to use his authority to crush a village in order to take by force what he cannot win by love: a young woman who is engaged to another man.

Cast
Bayarmaa Baatar : Sendem
Zolboot Gombo : Markhaa
Narankhuu Khatanbaatar : Dugar
G. Altanshagai : Sodnom

References

External links
 
 

2008 films
2008 drama films
Mongolian-language films
Films set in the 1930s
Films set in Mongolia
Films shot in Mongolia
2000s historical drama films
Mongolian drama films